Eugene Robinson (born 1963) is an American football player.

Eugene Robinson may also refer to:
Eugene Robinson (journalist) (born 1954), American journalist
Eugene Robinson, a singer in the band Oxbow

See also
Gene Robinson (disambiguation)